Willisville is the name of some places in North America:

Canada
Willisville, Ontario

United States
Willisville, Arkansas
Willisville, Illinois
Willisville, Indiana
Willisville, Virginia
previous name for Cornwall-on-Hudson, New York